Chabad-Lubavitch of Poland is a synagogue located at 19/508 Słomińskiego Street in Warsaw. Another temple of this type in Poland (ongoing ownership disputes) is the Isaac Jakubowicz Synagogue in Kraków.

The synagogue was founded in December 2005. The prayer room is part of the Jewish Centre, where a yeshiva, kosher restaurant and library are also located. The current Rabbi of the synagogue is Chabad Rabbi Shalom Dov Ber Stambler. Services are held every day, on all Sabbaths and holidays.

See also 

 Chabad house

References

Synagogues in Poland